"Déjame Entrar" (English: Let Me In) is a song released by Colombian recording artist Carlos Vives as the first single from his fifth major studio album of the same title in 2001.

Background and reception
The song was written by Martín Madera, Andrés Castro and Carlos Vives, and produced by Emilio Estefan, Jr. and Sebastián Krys and became Vives' second number-one hit in the Billboard Hot Latin Songs chart following "Fruta Fresca" two years prior. At the 3rd Latin Grammy Awards, Vives was the performer with the highest number of nominations, with six. "Déjame Entrar" was nominated for Record, Song of the Year and Best Short Form Music Video, and won for Best Tropical Song.

Critical reception
Diego Bonacich of Allmusic named the song one of the best included on Déjame Entrar. About the songs included on his album, Vives said: "I always have a fusion of rhythms, which I have already hinted on my previous albums. When I make music, I work with cumbia, vallenato, with all the Caribbean rhythms from northern Colombia, it is very difficult to escape the 'trulla', the Puerto-Rican plena, the Cuban son and Dominican merengue, because they are relatives." The singer also mentioned that the song was a vallenato/pop music blend. The track was later included on the compilation album 2002 Latin Grammy Nominees, which peaked at number five in the Billboard Top Latin Albums chart.

Chart performance
The song debuted in the Billboard Top Latin Songs chart (formerly Hot Latin Tracks) chart at number 12 the week of November 3, 2001, Vives' highest debut in the chart at the time, climbing to the top ten the following week. "Déjame Entrar" peaked at number-one on November 24, 2001, four weeks after its debut, the fastest for the singer, replacing "Suerte" by fellow Colombian singer Shakira and being succeeded by "Tantita Pena" by Mexican performer Alejandro Fernández, the following week. The song returned to the top of the chart on December 15, 2001 for another two weeks, before being succeeded by Fernández. By January 19, 2002, "Déjame Entrar" began a third period at the top, to be replaced one week later by Fernández. "Déjame Entrar" also peaked at number-one in the Tropical Airplay Charts and had a dance version released to several American nightclubs. Vives earned an ASCAP award for the song and the following singles from Déjame Entrar: "Luna Nueva" and "Carito".

Track listing
 US Déjame Entrar 12' Single
 "Déjame Entrar" (Club Mix)
 "Déjame Entrar" (Bonus Track)
 "Déjame Entrar" (Dub Mix)

Personnel
 Carlos Vives – performer, lyricist, co-producer
 Sebastián Krys – producer, arranger
 Emilio Estefan, Jr. – producer, arranger
 Andrés Castro – co-producer
 Egido Cuadrado – arranger
 Luis "El Papa" Pastor – arranger
 Mayte Montero – arranger
 Pablo Flores – Remix producer
Source:

See also
 List of number-one Billboard Hot Latin Tracks of 2001
 List of number-one Billboard Hot Latin Tracks of 2002

References

2001 singles
2001 songs
Carlos Vives songs
Latin Grammy Award for Best Tropical Song
Spanish-language songs
Song recordings produced by Emilio Estefan
Songs written by Carlos Vives
Songs written by Andrés Castro
EMI Latin singles